Castlerock railway station serves the villages of Castlerock, Articlave and their surrounding hamlets in County Londonderry, Northern Ireland.  Walkers use the station to reach Mussenden Temple, Downhill Strand and Benone.

The station opened on 18 July 1853 and was built to a design by the architect Charles Lanyon. It comprised a single-storey red brick on the 'up' platform. There is a modern two storey addition to this in a similar style.

The station signal box which was the last full-time mechanical signal box on the NIR network and the last to use block tokens was subsequently closed on 2 November 2016. The down platform, despite receiving a complete refurbishment two years prior, has now been taken out of service and the track lifted. All services calling at Castlerock now use the former up platform.

Service 

Mondays to Saturdays there is an hourly service towards Londonderry or Belfast Great Victoria Street operated by Northern Ireland Railways.

On Sundays there are 6 trains in each direction.

References 

Railway stations in County Londonderry
Railway stations opened in 1853
Railway stations served by NI Railways
1853 establishments in Ireland
Railway stations in Northern Ireland opened in 1853